HMS Nightingale was a 16-gun brig-sloop of the Seagull class of the British Royal Navy, launched in July 1805. She served during the Napoleonic Wars, primarily in the North Sea, where she captured a number of merchant vessels. The Navy sold her in 1815. She then became a merchantman, trading across the Atlantic, particularly between Liverpool and South America. She was last listed in 1829.

Royal Navy
In August 1805 Commander William Wilkinson commissioned Nightingale for the North Sea. That same day the same three British ships, together with the hired armed vessels Norfolk and Chapman, captured the Jonge Ebeling, Freundschaft, and Morgenstern. Six days later Nightingale captured the Prussian ship Frou Gesiner. The capture of the Twee Gebroders followed on 26 April. Then Nightingale captured the Prussian ships Jonge Gerrite, and De Drie Gebroeders on 23 May.

On 24 January 1807, Nightingale arrived at Edinburgh from Tunningen with news of a French defeat north of Warsaw. In the autumn Nightingale was present at the second battle of Copenhagen. On 20 October she received orders to accompany a small squadron that would escort the transport ships back to Yarmouth. He had taken up Admiral Gambier's offer to let him return to Britain with the duplicate despatches announcing Denmark's capitulation.

On 25 July 1809, Nightingale captured the Danish vessel Emanuel. That same day she captured Cutter No 16.

On 8 August three Danish vessels arrived at Leith.

Then on 16 August Nightingale captured the Danish vessel Transport No 52. ( was in company at the capture of Transport No. 52.)  Lastly, on 12 October, she captured the Helena Maria.

April 1810 saw Nightingale capture five vessels: Martini Jacobi, C. Stysring, master (15 April), Godes Fisne, A. Brede, master (18 April), Amicitia, Paul Paulson, master, (17 April), Magneten, H. Kilrub, master, (21 April), and a sloop, No. 60, name unknown (21 April. Nightingale was also in sight on 17 April when  captured Carolus, L.J. Kramer, master, and Enighied, N. Frius, master. That same day Nightingale was in company with  when they captured Amicitia, Paul Poulson, master.

Commander John Eveleigh replaced Wilkinson in November 1810.

Commander Christopher Nixon replaced Eveleigh in early 1812.  and Nightingale, under Nixon's command, were in company when they captured the vessels Liebe (27 February 1812), Maria Dorothea (7 March), Anna Serina (9 March) and Bodel Maria (24 March). Then on 19 May  Rifleman and Nightingale were again in company when they captured the Palmtract.

On 29 January 1813, Nightingale captured the American ship Calumet, of 187 tons bm, which had been carrying a cargo of tobacco from Boston to Marstrand. Nightingale sent her into Leith. Then on 9 March 1813, Nightingale was in company with  when they captured the Danish sloop Enigheiden. On 11 September Nightingale was at Leith receiving a 4-inch false keel.

Disposal
The Navy put Nightingale up for sale on 23 November 1815 at Sheerness. She was sold that day for £810.

Merchantman
Nightingale first appeared in Lloyd's Register (LR) in 1816 with D.Gray, master, Denniston, owner, and trade London–Charleston.

Fate
Nightingale was last listed in LR in 1829 with unchanged information.

Notes, citations, and references
Notes

Citations

References
 
 Parliament proceedings (1809) Naval papers respecting Copenhagen, Portugal, and the Dardanelles, presented to parliament in 1808.
 

 

Brig-sloops of the Royal Navy
1805 ships